The puzzle elimia (Elimia varians) was a species of freshwater snail with an operculum, aquatic gastropod mollusk in the family Pleuroceridae. This species was endemic to the United States. It is now extinct.

References 

Elimia
Extinct gastropods
Gastropods described in 1861
Taxonomy articles created by Polbot